The Lord of the Ice Garden is a four-volume science fiction and fantasy novel by Polish writer Jarosław Grzędowicz. The plot tells the story of a special forces soldier from Earth, dispatched to investigate a mystery on another planet, where magic exists.

The first volume was published by the Fabryka Słów publishing house in 2005. Following volumes of the saga were released in 2007, 2009 and 2012.

Plot 
The protagonist, Vuko Drakkainen, a special-forces soldier, equipped with the latest technology from Earth, making him almost a superhuman (effectively, a supersoldier), is dispatched to a planet called Midgaard, to look for human scientists from a covert research facility with whom all contact was lost two years earlier. The task, however, is extremely difficult, because the planet is inhabited by anthropoid civilization, moreover magic is present there. To become more like the local people, Vuko undergoes eye surgery and adopts the local name Ulf Nitj’sefni. A parasitic fungus – Cyfral was implanted in his brain.

In parallel, the fate of  Filar, the young Prince of the Tiger Throne, is presented. At the same time, the ancient faith in the Underground Mother is returning in the empire, and temples are being built in the cities – Red Towers. Social unrest caused by the drought is increasing. The emperor decides to destroy the Red Towers. As a result of the coup d'état, the imperial family dies, and the young son of the emperor as the last descendant of the family must escape. He is accompanied by Brus, a trusted man familiar with martial arts and survival. Both of them travel sidelong and observe the fall of the empire and the takeover of power by the fanatical followers of the Underground Mother.

It turns out that half of the human scientists have died, while the remaining four found themselves in a new situation, becoming Doers – people who could magically shape reality around them. Drakkainen's main opponents are two of them, who strive for world domination with ruthless methods. The third is insane, while the fourth becomes his ally. Eventually, the two main characters, Vuko and Filar, find each other in the Ice Garden and form an alliance to save the world.

Publication history
The series was published in Poland by Fabryka Słów in four volumes.
 vol I: 2005
vol II: 2007
vol III: 2009
vol IV: 2012

Translations 
 Czech editions:
 Pán ledové zahrady 1, pub. Triton, Prague, 2007, 
 Pán ledové zahrady 2, pub. Triton, Prague, 2008, 
 Pán ledové zahrady 3, pub. Triton, Prague, 2011, 
 Pán ledové zahrady 4, pub. Triton, Prague, 2013, 
 Russian editions:
Владыка Ледяного Сада: Ночной Странник, pub. AST, Moscow, 2017, 
 Владыка Ледяного Сада: В сердце тьмы, pub. AST, Moscow, 2017, 
 Владыка Ледяного Сада: Носитель судьбы, pub. AST, Moscow, 2018, 
 Владыка Ледяного Сада: Конец пути, pub. AST, Moscow, 2018,

Awards 

Volume 1 won the Zajdel Award in 2006 as well as the Sfinks Award.

Volumes 2, 3 and 4 were nominated for the Zajdel Award. Volume 3 also won the Nautilus Award in 2009 and Sfinks Award in 2010.

Reception 
After the publication of the first volume, the series received very favorable reception among the fans and critics, quickly winning several major Polish literary science fiction and fantasy awards. The author has been described as the successor to Andrzej Sapkowski and the resulting series compared to The Witcher. Already in 2012 the series has been described as having a "cult" status.

Analysis 
The series has been described as mixing  fantasy and science fiction genres.

Karolina Kowalczyk described Vuko  as having many characteristics of a fairy tale hero. She notes that while Vuko is generally a sympathetic protagonist with whom readers can identify, he is also flawed. One of his major flaws is a type of supremacist, superior attitude towards the natives, whom he often considers inferior, comparing his status as a "visitor from advanced civilization" to their status as "primitive barbarians". Kowalczyk also discuss the story of Vuko as the story of cultural assimilation and acceptance of "the other", as throughout the book, Vuko, effectively cut off from contact with Earth, is increasingly "going native", becoming influenced with and accepting of the local culture.

Anita Całek notes that one of the themes of the series is the exploration of an alien life and culture, and discusses the role of Vuko as a mediator between human and alien cultures.

Ksenia Olkusz in turn looked at Vuko's character as that of a soldier or warrior archetype, discussing his role as a hero (a "fantasy warrior"), and his aspects such as being effectively a superhuman or a supersoldier. She also discusses the concept of warrior culture as seen in the series, and notes numerous inspirations and references to Scandinavian mythology and Japanese culture (the concept of a samurai).

Other media 
The series inspired a board game, The Lord of the Ice Garden, published in 2014 in Polish and English.

Citations 

Polish fantasy novels
2005 fantasy novels
Polish science fiction novels
2005 science fiction novels